The word foral (plural: forais) is a noun derived from the Portuguese word foro, ultimately from Latin forum, equivalent to Spanish fuero, Galician foro, Catalan fur and  Basque foru.

The Carta de Foral, or simply Foral, was a royal document in Portugal and its former empire, whose purpose was to establish a concelho (Council) and regulate its administration, borders and privileges. A newly founded town would also need the king's approval through a Foral, in order to be considered one. In this case, the town's administration and privileges would be defined in that document. Forais were granted between the 12th and the 16th centuries.

The Foral was the basis for municipal foundation, thus the most important event of a city or town's history. It was critical to a successful land settling and an increase in crop yields, by giving more freedom and dignity, via a concession, to farmers, in an age when people were subject to near slave work, as servants of landlords. The Foral made a concelho free from feudal control, transferring power down to a neighbours council (concelho), with its own municipal autonomy. As a result, the population would become directly and exclusively under the dominion and jurisdiction of the crown, excluding the Lord from the power hierarchy. The Foral granted public lands to the collective use of the community, regulated taxes, tolls and fines and established protection rights and military duties within royal service.

A pillory (pelourinho) is directly linked to a Foral. It was raised after the Foral was granted and placed in the main square of the town.

Legal history of Portugal
Legal terminology